The Perfumed Garden of Sensual Delight ( Al-rawḍ al-ʿāṭir fī nuzhaẗ al-ḫāṭir)  is a fifteenth-century Arabic sex manual and work of erotic literature by Muhammad ibn Muhammad al-Nefzawi, also known simply as "Nefzawi".

The book presents opinions on what qualities men and women should have to be attractive and gives advice on sexual technique, warnings about sexual health, and recipes to remedy sexual maladies. It gives lists of names for the penis and vulva, has a section on the interpretation of dreams, and briefly describes sex among animals. Interspersed with these there are a number of stories which are intended to give context and amusement.

History 
According to the introduction of Colville's English translation, Muḥammad ibn Muḥammad al-Nafzawi probably wrote The Perfumed Garden sometime during the fifteenth century. Sheikh Nefzawi, full name Abu Abdullah Muhammad ben Umar Nafzawi, was born in the south of present-day Tunisia. He compiled at the request of the Hafsid ruler of Tunis, Abū Fāris ʿAbd al-ʿAzīz al-Mutawakkil, the present work. The reputation acquired by this work in the Arab world was similar to that of the Arabian Nights.

Content of the book
The Perfumed Garden is composed of an introduction followed by 21 chapters. Neither the first French translator nor Sir Richard Burton (who translated the text from the French version) give the 21st chapter. In these two translations, the book is about 100 pages long.

Introduction
The author praises God for having given us the pleasures of love-making. He says that God endowed women with beauty to inspire men to make love to them. He says that men have a natural weakness for the love of women. He says that he is a Muslim, that there is only one God and that Mohammed is his prophet. He says that he is the servant of God. He says that he wrote this book in Tunis for the Grand Vizir. He says that he had divided his work into different chapters to make it easier to read and understand.

Chapter 1: Men worthy of praise
A man worthy of praise can easily get an erection, he is not quick to discharge and, once he has lost his sperm, his member is soon stiff again. His member is long enough to reach the end of his partner's vagina and large enough to fill it. A man whose penis is too small cannot please women.

Nefzawi carries on with the fact that perfumes can excite women and that it is clever to use them. He tells the story of a man called Mocailma who used perfumes to possess a woman called Chedja, and it made wonders: she lost all her presence of mind and gave herself to him. It is at this point that three sexual positions are described for the first time: the man on top of the woman, who is lying on her back; the woman on all fours; the woman in prayer position, with her forehead on the ground and her buttocks in the air, elevated.

After the story, the author adds that a man worthy of praise is anxious to please women. He takes care of his appearance; he is truthful and sincere; he is brave and generous; he can be trusted; he is a good conversationalist. However, he does not boast about his relationship with other women.

To illustrate all this, the author tells the story of Bahloul, a buffoon who managed to make love to Hamdonna, the daughter of the King and the wife of the Grand Vizir. He first seduced her with his words. He then showed her his erected penis, which was strong and large. Upon doing this, she desired him and they made love. After they had climaxed, he kissed her lips and her breasts and then gave her cunnilingus. By that time, Bahloul was stiff again. They made love a second time; and then, when they had both climaxed, a third time.

Chapter 2: Women worthy of praise
A woman worthy of praise, according to Nefzawi has a perfect waist and is plump and lusty. She has black hair, large black eyes, an elegant nose, and vermilion lips. Her breath is of pleasant odour. Her breasts are full and firm. Her vulva does not emit a bad smell. Her hips are large. Her hands and her feet are of striking elegance.

Furthermore, she speaks and laughs rarely. Nefzawi adds that she never leaves the house and that she is not treacherous. If her husband shows his intention to make love, she complies with it. She assists him in his affairs. She does not complain or cry much. When her husband is downhearted, she shares his troubles. In public, she hides her secret parts and does not let anyone see them. She always dresses well and avoids showing her husband what might be repugnant to him.

At this point, the author tells the story of Dorerame, a slave who enjoyed making love with the most beautiful and well-born young women of his time, even if they belonged to other men. It is the longest story of the Perfumed Garden. We learn various things. For example, a woman says that a well-born lady could remain as long as six months without sex. We also learn that women can be very dangerous: he concludes this second chapter by saying that the moral of this tale is that "a man who falls in love with a woman imperils himself, and exposes himself to the greatest troubles."

Chapter 3: Men who are to be held in contempt
Men who are misshapen, whose member is short, who do not make love with vigour or in a manner that gives women enjoyment, who skip foreplay, who are quick to discharge their sperm and leave their partner right after the ejaculation, are men who are held in contempt by women.

Men who lie, who cannot be trusted, who conceal to their wives what they have been doing, except their adulterous affairs, are also men worthy of contempt.

Chapter 4: Women who are to be held in contempt
Ugly women are repulsive but also those who have a loud laugh. Women who joke around are said to be sluts. Also listed as disagreeable traits are revealing their husband's secrets, delighting in other's misfortune, pointing out other's shortcomings, busy-bodies, shrews, talkers, gossips, the lazy, harridans, the hysteric, the nag and the pilfering slag.

Chapter 5: Sexual Intercourse
It is recommended that a man should not eat or drink too much before having sex and that foreplay is necessary in order to excite the woman. When finished the man should not rush to leave and should do so on his right hand side.

Chapter 6: Sexual Technique
This chapter provides instructions on foreplay, specifying that it should include cunnilingus. The importance of the woman's enjoyment and climax are stressed, as are a number of steps to be taken to avoid injury or infection. Concerning sexual positions it is said that all are permissible (but Khawam's translation adds the words "except in her rear end" i.e. anal sex). Eleven positions are then listed, six with the woman on her back, one from behind, two with one or both on their sides, one over furniture and one hanging from a tree.

Chapter 7: The Harmful Effects of Intercourse
This chapter lists numerous ailments that can result from sex, including loss of sight, jaundice, sciatica, hernia, stones in the urinary tract and, that sex with old women is a deadly sure poison. It is recommended that sex is enjoyed in moderation as the worst diseases arise from sexual intercourse.

Chapter 8: Names for the Penis
More than 30 names are listed for the penis. There is then a long digression on dream interpretation.

Chapter 9: Names for the Vulva
Nearly 40 names are listed for the vulva. There is then a digression on dream interpretation. There follows the story of Ja'idi, a man who was laughed at by women but was still successful in bedding them.

Chapter 10: The Members of Animals
The names of animals' penises are listed, divided by hoofed beasts, cloven-hoofed beasts and clawed beasts. The behaviour of the lion is then discussed.

Chapter 11: Women's Tricks
This chapter opens by saying that women are more cunning than the devil. Four stories are presented, each with a woman who lies and tricks a man in some way, each ending with a warning to men about women. One story features an instance of zoophilia, with a woman and a donkey.

Chapter 12: Questions and Answers for Men and Women
The story of Mu'abbira, a wise woman, who provides insight into the workings of women's minds and desires, as well as again listing positive and negative traits for women.

Chapter 13: The Causes and Stimulation of Sexual Desire
A number of aphrodisiac recipes are presented.

Chapter 14: Remarks on Female Sterility and Methods of Treatment
This chapter speculates on likely causes of barrenness and proposes some cures. Possible causes include witches' spells and the actions of demons and jinn.

Chapter 15: The Causes of Male Sterility
This chapter deals with problems of male fertility. It is observed that failure to simultaneously orgasm can be a cause.

Chapter 16: Ways to Provoke Miscarriage
Recipes for abortion are listed.

Chapter 17: Treatment for Three Types of Erection Problem
This short chapter deals with failure to erect, failure to maintain an erection and premature ejaculation, with recipes for cures for each.

Chapter 18: How to Enlarge and Expand the Smaller Penis
This chapter opens by saying it will be of interest to women and men, because women do not like a small or limp penis.

Chapter 19: How to Remove Underarm and Vaginal Odour and Tighten the Vagina
Recipes are listed to treat each condition.

Chapter 20: The Symptoms of Pregnancy and How to Determine the Sex of the Unborn Child
Listed are signs of first, pregnancy, then whether the baby will be male, then if it will be female (those for male are more positive than those for female).

Chapter 21: The Benefits of Eggs and Sexually Stimulating Beverages
This chapter opens with recommendations for various foods to enhance stamina. There is then the story of Abu'l Hayja, Abu'l Hayloukh and Maymoun, noting that it is a celebrated story of debauchery but far-fetched and fantastic. It features a woman thought to be a lesbian (because she had not been interested in one of the men) and ends with a set of sexual challenges - one man must deflower eighty virgins without ejaculating, one must have sex with a woman for fifty days, without going limp, another must stand in front of the women and maintain an erection for thirty days and nights. The fourth man must fetch them what they want. They complete the sexual challenges and take the palace as reward. The volume then concludes with a recipe for a sexually stimulating beverage, but notes that it should not be consumed in summer.

Translations

1886: Burton English translation
The Perfumed Garden first became widely known in the English-speaking world through a translation from the French in 1886 by Sir Richard Francis Burton. Burton mentions that he considers that the work can be compared to those of Aretin and Rabelais, and the French book Conjugal Love by Nicolas Venette but what Burton believes makes The Perfumed Garden unique in the genre is "the seriousness with which the most lascivious and obscene matters are presented." Burton points out that not all of the ideas in The Perfumed Garden are original: "For instance, all the record of Moçama and of Chedja is taken from the work of Mohammed ben Djerir el Taberi; the description of the different positions for coition, as well as the movements applicable to them, are borrowed from Indian works; finally, the book Birds and Flowers by Azeddine el Mocadecci (Izz al-Din al-Mosadeqi) seems to have been consulted with respect to the interpretation of dreams."

The French manuscript that Burton translated from was one printed by Isidore Liseux in 1886. This manuscript's last chapter — Chapter 21 — was incomplete, apparently because it contained material on homosexuality and pederasty which had been removed. When Burton died in late 1890, he was working on a new translation of the original manuscript, including this missing chapter. The revised translation, due to be retitled The Scented Garden, was never published as Burton's wife Isabel burned the manuscript soon after his death.

1976: Khawam French translation 
A new French translation by René R. Khawam was published in 1976.

1999: Colville English translation 
In 1999, Jim Colville published the first English Perfumed Garden translated directly from the Arabic original.  Of the Burton translation, he says, "details were expanded, episodes introduced and whole sections incorporated from other, non-Arabic, sources.  The text is dressed up in a florid prose alien to the style of the original and many of the notes are sheer speculation.  The result is a consistently exaggerated and bizarre misrepresentation of the original".

Exaggeration on the part of Burton is vividly illustrated in Chapter 6, titled "Sexual Technique" in Colville's translation and "Concerning Everything That Is Favourable to the Act of Coition" in Burton's.  Burton's translation is perhaps 25 pages long, lists 39 sex positions as well as 6 types of sexual movement, and gives creative names to many of these.  Colville's translation is 2½ pages long, and lists 12 unnamed sex positions.

Inspiration for musical works
In 1923 the English composer Kaikhosru Shapurji Sorabji wrote Le jardin parfumé: Poem for Piano Solo.

RAH Band released a single entitled “Perfumed Garden” in 1982.

Omnium Gatherum, a Finnish melodic death metal band, also wrote a song called "The Perfumed Garden", released on their "Spirits and August Light" album in 2003.

Ray Manzarek, inspired by this, recorded a track called Perfumed Garden for his solo album The Whole Thing Started With Rock & Roll, Now It's Out Of Control.

See also 
 A Promenade of the Hearts
 Banquet of Chestnuts
 Kama Sutra
 Sexuality in Islam
 The Jewel in The Lotus

References

Further reading

 The Perfumed Garden of Sensual Delight, Muhammad ibn Muhammad al-Nafzawi, translated by Jim Colville, 1999, Kegan Paul International, 82 pages.
 La prairie parfumée ou s'ébattent les plaisirs, Umar Ibn Muhammad Nafzawi , translated by René R. Khawam, 1976, .
 The Perfumed Garden, Shaykh Nefwazi , translated by Sir Richard Francis Burton, Benares, 1886. Full text online Reprints:

External links
 

Arabic erotic literature
15th-century Arabic books
1886 books
Medieval Arabic literature
Arabic sex manuals